Odontomyia hydroleon,  also called the barred green colonel, is a European and Asian species of soldier fly.

Distribution
Afghanistan, Albania, Armenia, Austria, Belgium, Bulgaria, China, Czech Republic, Denmark, England, Estonia, Finland, France, Germany, Hungary, Israel, Lithuania, Mongolia, Netherlands, Norway, Poland, Romania, Russia, Slovakia, Sweden, Switzerland.

References

Stratiomyidae
Diptera of Europe
Diptera of Asia
Flies described in 1758
Taxa named by Carl Linnaeus